Stony Point Evangelical Lutheran Church is a historic church in Baldwin City, Kansas.  It has also been known as Christ's Evangelical Lutheran Church.  The church was built in 1882-83 and added to the National Register of Historic Places in 2006.

It rests on a native limestone foundation.

References

Lutheran churches in Kansas
Churches on the National Register of Historic Places in Kansas
Churches completed in 1882
Churches in Douglas County, Kansas
National Register of Historic Places in Douglas County, Kansas